Lijia Township is a township in Qingliu County, Fujian, China. , it administers the following eight villages:
Li Village
Hebei Village
Xianshui Village
Changguan Village
Zaohepai Village
Wujia Village
Gukeng Village
Luokeng Village

References 

Township-level divisions of Fujian
Qingliu County